Begum Aziza Fatima Imam was an Indian politician and social activist who was elected as Member of Rajya Sabha in 1973 and 1979. She was adopted by her maternal uncle Syed Ali Imam and her wife  Begum Anis Fatima Imam, who was Aziza's Maternal aunt.

References

Rajya Sabha members from Bihar
Indian National Congress politicians
1924 births
1996 deaths
Indian National Congress politicians from Bihar